Pernis  may refer to:
 Pernis (bird), a genus of honey-buzzards in the Perninae subfamily
 Pernis, Netherlands, a neighborhood of Rotterdam, Netherlands
 Pernis (station), a metro station in Pernis, Rotterdam